World Changed Forever is the sixth studio album by Finnish power metal band Dreamtale. Released on The Secret Door Records label on 26 April 2013 in Finland, it reached number 41 on Suomen virallinen lista, The Official Finnish Charts.

Track listing 
 "The Shore" – 2:23
 "Island of My Heart" – 5:37
 "Tides of War" – 4:23
 "We Have No God" – 5:09
 "The Signs Were True" – 5:09
 "The Heart After Dark" – 4:26
 "Join the Rain" – 5:02
 "Back to the Stars" – 5:53
 "World Changed Forever" – 5:59
 "My Next Move" – 3:52
 "Dreamtime" – 6:34
 "Destiny's Chance" – 3:54
 "The End of Our Days" (Korean edition bonus track) – 4:22

Personnel 
Erkki Seppänen – vocals
Rami Keränen – guitar, backing vocals
Seppo Kolehmainen – guitar
Akseli Kaasalainen – keyboards
Heikki Ahonen – bass
Petteri Rosenbom – drums

2013 albums
Dreamtale albums